Sarah Thomas (born 17 November 1992) is a Welsh female badminton player.

Achievements

BWF International Challenge/Series
Women's doubles

Mixed doubles

 BWF International Challenge tournament
 BWF International Series tournament
 BWF Future Series tournament

References

External links
 

1992 births
Living people
Sportspeople from Cardiff
Welsh female badminton players
Commonwealth Games competitors for Wales
Badminton players at the 2014 Commonwealth Games
Badminton players at the 2010 Commonwealth Games